Zirl is a market town in the district of Innsbruck-Land in the Austrian state of Tyrol located 10 km west of Innsbruck at the bottom of a pass up the side of the Zirler Berg, leading to Seefeld and ultimately to Germany. The location was mentioned as "Cyreolu" and "Cyreola" in documents in 799 for the first time. Zirl was damaged several times by floods and fires but nevertheless the population has increased in recent years. The status "Market town" was received in 1984.

Population

Sights
A remarkable sight is its parish church, richly adorned with frescoes.

References

External links

Cities and towns in Innsbruck-Land District